Tuscaloosa County School System is a public school district headquartered in Tuscaloosa, Alabama, United States. The district's boundaries parallel that of the county of Tuscaloosa, but do not include the City of Tuscaloosa proper, which is served by Tuscaloosa City Schools.

Schools

High schools
Brookwood High School
Hillcrest High School 
Holt High School
Northside High School
Sipsey Valley High School
Tuscaloosa County High School

Middle schools
Brookwood Middle School
Collins-Riverside Middle School
Davis Emerson Middle School
Duncanville Middle School
Echols Middle School
Hillcrest Middle School 
Northside Middle School
Sipsey Valley Middle School

Elementary schools
Big Sandy Elementary School
Brookwood Elementary School
Buhl Elementary School
Cottondale Elementary School
Crestmont Elementary School
Englewood Elementary School
Faucett-Vestavia Elementary School
Flatwoods Elementary School
Holt Elementary School
Huntington Place Elementary School
Lake View Elementary School
Matthews Elementary School
Maxwell Elementary School
Myrtlewood Elementary School
Northport Elementary School
Vance Elementary School
Walker Elementary School
Westwood Elementary School

Other campuses
Lloyd Wood Education Center (Sprayberry Education Center)

See also
List of school districts in Alabama
Tuscaloosa City Schools

References

External links
Official homepage

School districts in Alabama
Education in Tuscaloosa County, Alabama